The Israel national under-17 football team represents Israel in association football at the under-17 youth level, and is controlled by the Israel Football Association.

The team is for Israeli players aged 17 or under at the start of a two-year European Under-17 Football Championship cycle, so players can be up to 17 years old.

Competition history
Although the Israel Football Association became a member of UEFA as late as 1994, Israel U-16s took part in several European youth championships since the late 1980s, beginning with the 1987 European U-16 tournament, for which they qualified but failed to progress past the group stage after a defeat to Turkey U16s and draws against Denmark and Greece.

The team managed to qualify for six other European U-16 championships (including five consecutive appearances between 1996 and 2000) before UEFA's realignment of youth levels in 2001. Since then, Israel U17s only qualified twice for the final tournament, in 2003 and 2005. Their best result in the under-16 era came in the 1996 European U-16 Championship where they won third place, beating Greece in a third-place play-off match.

European Championship

Under-16 format

Under-17 format

Past squads

UEFA European Under-17 Championship squads
 2003 UEFA European Under-17 Championship squad
 2005 UEFA European Under-17 Championship squad

Current squad 
 The following players were called up for the 2023 UEFA European Under-17 Championship qualification matches.
 Match dates: 25-31 October 2022
 Opposition: ,  and 
Caps and goals correct as of: 26 September 2022, after the match against

See also 
 UEFA European Under-17 Championship
 Israel national football team
 Israel national under-21 football team
 Israel national under-19 football team
 Israel national under-18 football team
 Israel national under-16 football team

References

External links 
  of the Israel Football Federation

European national under-17 association football teams
F
Youth football in Israel